The Samsung Galaxy J3 (2017) (also known as Galaxy J3 Pro) is an Android smartphone manufactured by Samsung Electronics and was released in June 2017.

Specifications

Hardware 
The Galaxy J3 (2017) is powered by an Exynos 7570 SoC including a quad-core 1.4 GHz ARM Cortex-A53 CPU, an ARM Mali-T720MP2 GPU with 1.5 (AT&T) or 2 GB RAM and 16 GB of internal storage which can be upgraded up to 256 GB via microSD card.

It has a 5.0-inch TFT LCD display with a HD Ready resolution. The 13 MP rear camera features f/1.9 aperture, autofocus, LED flash, HDR and Full HD video. The front camera has 5 MP, also with f/2.2 aperture.

Software 
The J3 (2017) is originally shipped with Android 7.0 "Nougat" and Samsung's Experience user interface. An update to 8.0 "Oreo" became available in August 2018. As of August 2019 the latest version 9.0 "Pie" including One UI became available.

See also 
 Samsung Galaxy
 Samsung Galaxy J series

References

External links 

Samsung Galaxy
Samsung smartphones
Android (operating system) devices
Mobile phones introduced in 2017
Discontinued smartphones